Reddyanus acanthurus is a species of scorpion in the family Buthidae.

References

acanthurus
Animals described in 1899